Walter O'Brien (born 1975), is  Irish businessman, information technologist, executive producer, and media personality.

Walter O'Brien may also refer to:

 Walter O'Brien (Scorpion), fictional character in the American drama television series Scorpion
 Walter A. O'Brien (1914–1998), Progressive Party politician